Sursaigh is an island off North Uist in the Sound of Harris, Scotland.

The island has "a patchy cover of glacial deposits."

Airigh na h-Aon Oidhche (one-night shieling) is a ruined hut on the south side of the island. It is said that in the late 19th century a shepherd who was staying on the island was awakened by the sound of gulls and his frightened dog. Rushing outside he saw "an enormous cartwheel in the sky making a strange noise". He fled the island and never returned.

See also
 List of Outer Hebrides

Footnotes

Islands of the Sound of Harris
Uninhabited islands of the Outer Hebrides